Asphyxia is a 2017 Iranian neo-noir film written, produced and directed by Fereydoun Jeyrani and starring Navid Mohammadzadeh, Elnaz Shakerdoust, Mahaya Petrosian and Pardis Ahmadieh.

Plot
Masoud takes his wife who has neurotic tensions to the asylum to take care of her.

Cast
Navid Mohammadzadeh as Masoud Sazgar
Elnaz Shakerdoust as Sahra Mashreghi
Mahaya Petrossian as Zohre
Pardis Ahmadieh as Nasim Sazgar
Poulad Kimiaei as Mansour Sazgar
Parviz Poorhosseini
Ehsan Amani as Zohre's Husband
Asadollah Yekta as Doctor

References

External links
 

Iranian drama films
Films directed by Fereydoun Jeyrani